The Mute of Portici may refer to:
 La muette de Portici, an opera by Daniel Auber
 The Mute of Portici (1952 film), an Italian historical melodrama film
 The Mute of Portici (1922 film), a German silent film

See also
 The Dumb Girl of Portici, a 1916 American silent historical drama film